Pseudochromis magnificus, the magnificent dottyback, is a species of ray-finned fish 
found in the Cargados Carajos in the Western Indian Ocean which is a member of the family Pseudochromidae.

References

magnificus
Taxa named by Roger Lubbock
Fish described in 1977
Fish of the Indian Ocean